Eleonora Margarida J. Schmitt (born August 23, 1931) is a former Olympic freestyle swimmer from Brazil, who competed at one edition of the Summer Olympics for her native country. At 16 years old, she was at the 1948 Summer Olympics, in London, where she finished 6th in the 4×100-metre freestyle, along with Talita Rodrigues, Maria da Costa and Piedade Coutinho. She also swam the 100-metre freestyle, not reaching the finals.

References

1931 births
Living people
Brazilian female freestyle swimmers
Swimmers at the 1948 Summer Olympics
Olympic swimmers of Brazil